Milorad Krivokapić (born 8 January 1956) is a retired Serbian water polo player. He won a silver Olympic gold medal winner with Yugoslavia at the 1980 Summer Olympics and a gold medal at the 1984 Summer Olympics. He is currently president of Serbian water polo association.

See also
 Yugoslavia men's Olympic water polo team records and statistics
 List of Olympic champions in men's water polo
 List of Olympic medalists in water polo (men)
 List of men's Olympic water polo tournament goalkeepers
 List of world champions in men's water polo
 List of World Aquatics Championships medalists in water polo

References

External links
 

1956 births
Living people
People from Herceg Novi
Montenegrin male water polo players
Yugoslav male water polo players
Water polo goalkeepers
Olympic water polo players of Yugoslavia
Olympic gold medalists for Yugoslavia
Olympic silver medalists for Yugoslavia
Water polo players at the 1980 Summer Olympics
Water polo players at the 1984 Summer Olympics
Olympic medalists in water polo
Medalists at the 1984 Summer Olympics
Medalists at the 1980 Summer Olympics
Serbs of Montenegro